Constitutional Assembly elections were held in Bulgaria on 5 June 1911. The result was a victory for the People's Party–Progressive Liberal Party alliance, which won 342 of the 410 seats. Voter turnout was 54.0%.

Results

References

Bulgaria
1911 in Bulgaria
Elections in Bulgaria
June 1911 events
1911 elections in Bulgaria